Gurdwara Rori Sahib is a gurdwara which is located in Eminabad, Gujranwala, Punjab, Pakistan. It was built during the reign of Maharaja Ranjeet Singh.

References

Gujranwala
Gurdwaras in Pakistan
Cultural heritage sites in Punjab, Pakistan
Tourist attractions in Punjab, Pakistan
Religious buildings and structures in Punjab, Pakistan
19th-century gurdwaras